Royal Air Force Driffield or RAF Driffield is a former Royal Air Force station in the East Riding of Yorkshire, in England. It is now operated by the Defence Infrastructure Organisation, as the Driffield Training Area.

History

The site was first opened in 1918 by the Royal Air Force under the name of RAF Eastburn, and closed in 1920. In 1935 a new airfield was built, initially training bomber crews. In 1977 the site was turned over to the British Army for use as a driving school, and was renamed Alamein Barracks, a satellite to Normandy Barracks of the Defence School of Transport at Leconfield.

The station was the initial posting of Leonard Cheshire VC, who was at that time a member of 102 Squadron.

On 15 August 1940 there was a German air raid on the airfield. Casualties included the first fatality in the Women's Royal Air Force.

On 1 August 1959, the station was armed with PGM-17 Thor ballistic missiles, which were subsequently decommissioned by April 1963.

Units
The following units were here at some point:

References

Citations

Bibliography

External links

UK Airfields - Driffield
Derelict Places – RAF Driffield – May 2011
Airfields of Britain Conservation Trust – RAF Driffield (Eastburn)
Control Towers – RAF Driffield airfield

Military units and formations established in 1918
Buildings and structures in the East Riding of Yorkshire
Royal Air Force stations in Yorkshire
World War I airfields
1918 establishments in the United Kingdom
Royal Air Force stations of World War II in the United Kingdom
Driffield
World War I sites in England